Nóqui is a commune of Angola, located in the province of Zaire in the municipality Noqui.

See also 

 Communes of Angola

References 

Populated places in Zaire Province
Former populated places in Angola